Stalag III-A was a German World War II prisoner-of-war camp at Luckenwalde, Brandenburg,  south of Berlin. It housed Polish, Dutch, Belgian, French, Yugoslav, Russian, Italian, American, Romanian, British and other Allied POWs.

Camp history

Planning for the camp commenced before the invasion of Poland, which started World War II. It was designed to hold 10,000 men, was the largest in the 3rd Military District, and was considered a model for other camps.

In mid-September 1939 the first Polish POWs arrived, and were housed in large  by  tents, and set to work building the barrack huts before the winter set in. Once their work was complete the Poles were relocated, and the first inhabitants of the camp were Dutch and Belgian. They only remained there for a brief time before being replaced by 43,000 French POWs, who arrived in mid-1940, and remained the largest group of prisoners until the end of the war. They included 4,000 Africans from French colonial units. In 1941 some 300 of these took part in the Nazi propaganda film Germanin. The French were joined in 1941 by Yugoslav and Russian prisoners, then in late 1943 some 15,000 Italian military internees arrived, though most were quickly dispersed to other camps. In late 1944 small numbers of American, Romanian, British and Polish prisoners arrived, including Polish insurgents of the Warsaw Uprising aged 14–17. In January 1945, a group of Polish officers was brought to the camp from German-occupied Hungary.

More than 200,000 prisoners passed through the Stalag III-A, and at its height in May 1944 there were a total of 48,600 POW registered there. However, no more than 6,000-8,000 were ever housed at the main camp, with the rest sent out to work in forestry and industry in more than 1,000 Arbeitskommando ("Work Companies") spread out over the entire state of Brandenburg.

As of January 1, 1945, it housed 45,942 POWs, including 24,996 French, 12,517 Soviet, 4,093 Serbian, 1,499 American, 1,433 British, 1,310 Italian, 86 Polish and 8 Romanian.

In early 1945, some 1,000 POWs from the Stalag VIII-C and Stalag Luft III were brought to Stalag III-A, and also POWs from the Stalag XXI-C in Wolsztyn. In February 1945 prisoners from Stalag III-B Furstenberg were evacuated to Stalag III-A, adding to the already overcrowded and unhygienic conditions. Finally, as the Russians approached the guards fled the camp leaving the prisoners to be liberated by the Red Army on 22 April 1945.

Treatment of prisoners
The camp was generally run according to the guidelines of the Geneva Convention and the Hague Regulations, and was regularly inspected by representatives of the International Committee of the Red Cross (ICRC). Russian POWs were excluded from this on the grounds that the USSR was not a signatory of the Geneva Convention, and suffered significantly poorer conditions as a result. Generally treatment of prisoners depended on nationality. The French, British and Americans were treated relatively well, while the Italians, and particularly the Russians, suffered from the consequences of maltreatment.

In regards to Poles, the Germans violated the Geneva Conventions, by forcing them to relinquish their POW status to become civilian forced laborers. The Germans attempted to achieve this by deporting the Poles to more severe forced labour subcamps or threatening them with deportation to Nazi concentration camps. Polish prisoner Józef Dziurawiec recalled the poor conditions, including widespread starvation and diseases, including typhus, dysentery and pediculosis.

Italian prisoner Michele Zotta later reported that for the first few days of his imprisonment he slept on the ground in a small tent. As to rations, on the first day he received one kilogram of rye bread to share with fifteen other prisoners, with some butter and jelly. From then on the daily routine was for the Germans to distribute a bucket of potatoes to be shared between twenty-five prisoners. Zotta also notes that when prisoners collapsed the Germans would beat them.

However, there are also accounts that the Germans were low on food themselves. Regardless, Stalag III-A remains an example of poor conduct on the part of the Germans towards prisoners of war.

Deaths

It is estimated that 4,000 to 5,000 prisoners died while in the camp. During the winter of 1941/42 a typhus epidemic killed around 2,000-2,500 Russians, and mortality rates of Soviet prisoners was extremely high compared to the POW of other nations. Non-Soviet prisoners were buried with military honours in individual graves at the camp cemetery, while the Russian dead were buried anonymously in mass graves.

Prisoners
Stefan Mieczysław Grzybowski, professor and rector of the Jagiellonian University
Phil Lamason, Royal New Zealand Air Force officer pilot
Józef Warszawski, Polish priest, philosopher and Polish resistance member

See also
List of prisoner-of-war camps in Germany
Roy Allen

References

External links

Stalag III-A Prisoners of War

 

World War II prisoner of war camps in Germany
World War II prisoner of war massacres
1939 establishments in Germany
1945 disestablishments in Germany